Dortokidae is an extinct family of freshwater pan-pleurodiran turtles, known from the Cretaceous and Paleocene of Europe. Only four species have been named, but indeterminate fossils show that they were abundant across western and eastern-central Europe during the Cretaceous. The family is only known from postcranial remains.

Genera 

 Eodortoka Pérez-García, Gasulla, and Ortega 2014 Arcillas de Morella Formation, Spain, Early Cretaceous (Aptian) 
 Dortoka Lapparent de Broin and Murelaga, 1999 Laño site, Spain, Late Cretaceous (Campanian-Maastrichtian) Sînpetru Formation, Romania, Late Cretaceous (Maastrichtian)
 Ronella Lapparent de Broin in Gheerbrant et al. 1999 Jibou Formation, Romania Paleocene (Thanetian) (alternatively considered a species of Dortoka)

References 

Pleurodira
Prehistoric turtles